Henrique Wilsons Da Cruz Martins (born 6 December 1997), also known as Henrique Cruz, is a football player who currently plays for the Timor-Leste national football team.

International career
Henrique made his senior international debut in the match against Mongolia in the 2018 FIFA World Cup qualification (AFC) on 12 March 2015.

International goals
Scores and results list East Timor's goal tally first.

References

External links
 
 

1997 births
Living people
East Timorese footballers
Timor-Leste international footballers
Association football forwards
Footballers at the 2018 Asian Games
Competitors at the 2017 Southeast Asian Games
Asian Games competitors for East Timor
Competitors at the 2019 Southeast Asian Games
Southeast Asian Games competitors for East Timor